Ian Gibson (born 24 July 1956 in Hamilton) is a Scottish former footballer who played as a midfielder.

Career
Gibson began his professional career with Partick Thistle and made over 100 league appearances for The Jags during his seven years at Firhill. A move to Dundee United during the 1980-81 season beckoned, although Gibson played little over twenty league matches during his eighteen months at Tannadice, spending time on loan with Morton and St Johnstone. Gibson returned to Muirton Park permanently in 1983 and became player/manager in July 1985, a position he held until April 1987. Following his departure from Perth, Gibson spent two years with Raith Rovers, before moving to Arbroath in 1989. Shortly afterwards, he took up his second player/manager position, before being sacked in 1991.

References

External links
 

1956 births
Living people
Scottish footballers
Scottish Football League players
Scottish football managers
Partick Thistle F.C. players
Dundee United F.C. players
Greenock Morton F.C. players
St Johnstone F.C. players
Raith Rovers F.C. players
Arbroath F.C. players
St Johnstone F.C. managers
Arbroath F.C. managers
Scottish Football League managers
Association football midfielders